Tarjei Dale (born 1 April 1983) is a retired Norwegian professional football player.

Club career

Dale came to Odd Grenland as a junior player from Gjerpen IF in 2000. He got called up to their main squad in 2002 after playing several games for their reserve team. Tarjei played his first match for Odd Grenland when he played 1 minute against Moss FK in July 2002, that was his only match for the season.

In 2006 Odd Grenland played relegation play-off against Bryne FK. In the first match, where Odd Grenland won 3–0 at home, Tarjei scored two goals. In the second match, where Odd Grenland won 7–1 away, Tarje scored 3 goals.

In August 2008, Tarjei signed a two-year contract with Sogndal Fotball, he came to Sogndal from Odd Grenland on a free transfer. He played the fall season for Sogndal and played 11 matches and scored 5 goals.

Dale joined Notodden ahead of the 2010-season.

References

External links
Official Website 
Oddrane.no@

1983 births
Living people
Sportspeople from Skien
Norwegian footballers
Odds BK players
Pors Grenland players
Sogndal Fotball players
Notodden FK players
Eliteserien players
Norwegian First Division players
Association football midfielders